Hatwise Choice: Archive Recordings 1973—1975, Volume 1 is a 2005 compilation album by Canterbury scene band Hatfield and the North. The compilation features a mixture of on-stage live recordings, performances for radio, and a demo.

Track listing

References

External links 
 Hatfield and the North - Hatwise Choice - Archive Recordings 1973-1975, Volume 1 (2005) album releases & credits at Discogs
 Hatfield and the North - Hatwise Choice - Archive Recordings 1973-1975, Volume 1 (2005) album credits & user reviews at ProgArchives.com

Hatfield and the North albums
2005 compilation albums
Burning Shed compilation albums